Resham Tipnis is an Indian television actress. She did a small role of Anjali Sinha in Shah Rukh Khan starrer film Baazigar in 1993. She was a contestant of Bigg Boss Marathi Season 1. She is now seen Sony Entertainment Television's Punyashlok Ahilyabai as Queen Dwarkabai Sahib after 8 year leap since July 2022.

Personal life
Tipnis married actor Sanjeev Seth in 1993 at the age of 20, but they divorced in 2004. They have two children Manav Seth and Rishika Seth. As of 2018, she is in a relationship with Sandesh Kirtikar.

Television

Filmography

See also
 List of Indian television actresses
 Bigg Boss Marathi

References

External links
 

1970s births
Living people
Indian television actresses
Bigg Boss Marathi contestants
Actresses in Marathi television
Actresses in Marathi cinema